The 1999 Monte Carlo Open was a men's tennis tournament played on outdoor clay courts. It was the 93rd edition of the Monte Carlo Open, and was part of the ATP Super 9 of the 1999 ATP Tour. It took place at the Monte Carlo Country Club in Roquebrune-Cap-Martin, France, near Monte Carlo, Monaco, from 19 April through 25 April 1999.

Thirteenth-seeded Gustavo Kuerten won the singles title.

Finals

Singles

 Gustavo Kuerten defeated  Marcelo Ríos, 6–4, 2–1, retired
It was Gustavo Kuerten's 1st title of the year, and his 4th overall. It was his 1st Masters title of the year, and overall.

Doubles

 Olivier Delaître /  Tim Henman defeated  Jiří Novák /  David Rikl, 6–2, 6–3

References

External links
 
 ATP tournament profile
 ITF tournament edition details

 
Monte Carlo Masters
Monte-Carlo Masters
1999 in Monégasque sport
Monte